Polites draco, the draco skipper, Rocky Mountain skipper or dragon skipper, is a butterfly in the family Hesperiidae. It is found on the Rocky Mountain states and provinces from Arizona to the Yukon Territory.

The wingspan is 21–33 mm.

There is one generation with adults on wing from June to early August.

The larvae feed on various grasses. Adults feed on flower nectar.

References

External links
Draco Skipper, Butterflies and Moths of North America

Butterflies of North America
Polites (butterfly)
Butterflies described in 1871
Taxa named by William Henry Edwards